Jay Pardee Rolison Jr. (April 5, 1929 – August 29, 2007) was an American lawyer and politician from New York who served in the New York Senate from 1967 to 1990.

Life
He was born on April 5, 1929, in Madison, Morris County, New Jersey, the son of Jay Pardee Rolison (died 1987) and Margaret (Denman) Rolison (1900–1969). He attended Seton Hall Preparatory School, and graduated B.A. from Providence College. He graduated LL.B. from Fordham Law School in 1954, and then worked for two years in the Judge Advocate General's Office at Fort Gordon. Afterwards he practiced law in Poughkeepsie, New York and entered politics as a Republican. He married Barbara C. Hanley (born 1929), and they had two children.

Rolison was a member of the New York State Senate from 1967 to 1990, sitting in the 177th, 178th, 179th, 180th, 181st, 182nd, 183rd, 184th, 185th, 186th, 187th and 188th New York State Legislatures. He became Assistant Majority Leader in 1985

He died on August 29, 2007, at his home in the Town of Poughkeepsie, Dutchess County, New York.

References

1929 births
2007 deaths
Politicians from Poughkeepsie, New York
Republican Party New York (state) state senators
Providence College alumni
People from Madison, New Jersey
Fordham University School of Law alumni
Seton Hall Preparatory School alumni
20th-century American politicians